Seifu on EBS is an Ethiopian late-night talk show airing each Sunday at 9:00 p.m. in Ethiopian Time on EBS TV. The hour and a half long show premiered on 24 October 2013, and is hosted by comedian and radio host Seifu Fantahun. Modeled after the traditional late-night talk shows of the U.S., the show incorporates the use of comedy bits, monologue jokes, musical guest performances as well as celebrity interviews.

Episode format 
Seifu on EBS follows the already established six-piece late night format popularized by many late-night talk show hosts of United States. Each episode of Seifu on EBS  is 90 minutes in length, including commercials, and typically consists of:
 Act 1: Monologue
 Act 2: Comedy Bit(s)
 Act 3: Celebrity Interview 1
 Act 4: Celebrity Interview 1 continued
 Act 5: Celebrity Interview 2
 Act 6: Musical or stand-up comedy guest, signoff guests come from a wide range of cultural sources, and include actors, musicians, authors, athletes and political figures.

Monologue 
Seifu starts each episode with a monologue drawing from current news stories and issues. The monologue is sometimes accompanied by pictures and videos found on social media.

Comedy bits 
Following the monologue, Seifu usually interacts with the audience through games or takes part in comedy sketches involving a guest on the show.

See also 
 EBS TV
 Television in Ethiopia

References 

Television talk shows
2013 television series debuts
Late night television programming
Ethiopian television series
Amharic-language television